Cabaret is a 1953 Spanish musical film directed by Eduardo Manzanos Brochero and starring  Fernando Rey, Nati Mistral and José Bódalo.

Synopsis 
The film begins with a news item published in the newspapers announcing the investigation by the police of a major scam. Precisely, following in the footsteps of the author of that crime, we will discover the cabaret where the entire plot takes place. A place where the paths of a multitude of characters cross.

Cast
  Fernando Rey
 Nati Mistral
 José Bódalo
 Félix Dafauce
 María Luz Galicia
 Rafael Romero Marchent
 Enrique Herreros
 Miguel Pastor
 José Luis Ozores  
 Manuel San Román
 Matilde Muñoz Sampedro
 Rafael Alonso
 Mariano Ozores
 Luisa Puchol
 Pilar Vela

References

Bibliography 
 Pascual Cebollada. Biografía y películas de Fernando Rey. C.I.L.E.H., 1992.

External links 
 

1953 films
1953 musical films
Spanish musical films
1950s Spanish-language films
Films produced by Ricardo Sanz
Spanish black-and-white films
1950s Spanish films